Yang Wei (born 13 January 1979) is a Chinese former badminton player who affiliate with Guangdong provincial team.

Career 
A woman's doubles specialist, Yang has won some forty international titles, most of them in the sport's top tier events, since 1998. Prior to 2003 she partnered Huang Nanyan with whom she earned a silver medal at the 2000 Sydney Olympics and gained the winning point against South Korea in the 2002 Uber Cup (women's world team championship) final. Her subsequent partnership with Zhang Jiewen has been even more successful as they have shared international domination with compatriot rivals Gao Ling and Huang Sui. Yang and Zhang captured gold at the 2004 Athens Olympics by defeating Gao and Huang in the final. They bested the same team in winning both the 2005 and 2007 BWF World Championships. On the other hand, Gao and Huang have been an obstacle for them at the prestigious All-England Championships, defeating Yang and Zhang in the 2003, 2004, and 2006 finals. Curiously, this is the one major tournament that neither Yang nor Zhang has ever won.

In 2008 Yang helped China to secure its sixth consecutive Uber Cup title and won women's doubles at the Swiss, Thailand, and Malaysia Opens with Zhang Jiewen. At the Beijing Olympics where they were first seeded, however, Yang and Zhang were upset in the quarterfinals by Japan's Miyuki Maeda and Satoko Suetsuna. The event was eventually won by a younger Chinese pair, Du Jing and Yu Yang, perhaps signaling a changing of the guard in the Chinese dynasty. Yang Wei received an award during a ceremony to mark her retirement with five other teammates from the Chinese national badminton team on the sidelines of the China Open badminton event in Shanghai, November 23, 2008.

Achievements

Olympic Games 
Women's doubles

BWF World Championships 
Women's doubles

World Cup 
Women's doubles

Asian Games 
Women's doubles

Asian Championships 
Women's doubles

World Junior Championships 
Girls' doubles

Asian Junior Championships 
Girls' doubles

BWF Superseries 
The BWF Superseries, which was launched on 14 December 2006 and implemented in 2007, is a series of elite badminton tournaments, sanctioned by the Badminton World Federation (BWF). BWF Superseries levels are Superseries and Superseries Premier. A season of Superseries consists of twelve tournaments around the world that have been introduced since 2011. Successful players are invited to the Superseries Finals, which are held at the end of each year.

Women's doubles

  BWF Superseries Finals tournament
  BWF Superseries Premier tournament
  BWF Superseries tournament

BWF Grand Prix 
The BWF Grand Prix had two levels, the BWF Grand Prix and Grand Prix Gold. It was a series of badminton tournaments sanctioned by the Badminton World Federation (BWF) which was held from 2007 to 2017. The World Badminton Grand Prix has been sanctioned by the International Badminton Federation from 1983 to 2006.

Women's doubles

Mixed doubles

  BWF Grand Prix Gold tournament
  BWF & IBF Grand Prix tournament

References

External links 
 Yang Wei at sports.sina.com.cn 
 

1979 births
Living people
Badminton players from Wuhan
Badminton players from Guangdong
Chinese female badminton players
Badminton players at the 2000 Summer Olympics
Badminton players at the 2004 Summer Olympics
Badminton players at the 2008 Summer Olympics
Olympic badminton players of China
Olympic gold medalists for China
Olympic silver medalists for China
Olympic medalists in badminton
Medalists at the 2000 Summer Olympics
Medalists at the 2004 Summer Olympics
Badminton players at the 2002 Asian Games
Badminton players at the 2006 Asian Games
Asian Games medalists in badminton
Asian Games gold medalists for China
Asian Games silver medalists for China
Asian Games bronze medalists for China
Medalists at the 2002 Asian Games
Medalists at the 2006 Asian Games
World No. 1 badminton players